Short Short Dramas is an American dramatic anthology series which aired from September 30, 1952 to April 9, 1953 on NBC. During the original run it was hosted by Ruth Woods, whose segments were dropped when it was syndicated (see below).

While most American anthology TV series of the 1950s aired weekly in either half-hour or hour-long time-slots, Short Short Dramas aired in a 15-minute time-slot, with two episodes broadcast each week on Tuesday and Thursday. Episodes were 12-minutes excluding ads, and a total of 78 episodes were produced. Additionally, unlike most early anthology series which were live, Short Short Dramas was an early example of a filmed dramatic series, still a relatively new idea at the time (the first filmed dramatic TV series had aired in 1949, but they were only just starting to become more common in 1952).

Among its guest stars were Ernest Borgnine, Cliff Robertson, Richard Kiley, E.G. Marshall, and Leslie Nielsen.  Directors included Daniel Petrie.

Syndication
Although it only ran for one season, it nevertheless proved popular enough to have syndicated repeats under the title Playhouse 15. A 1955 trade ad lists MCA as being the distributor.

It was also exported to Australia. Starting in 1959 it aired in Sydney on ATN-7 and in Melbourne on GTV-9, as this was prior to the creation of the Nine Network and Seven Network.

References

External links
Short Short Dramas at CVTA with episode list
Short Short Dramas on IMDb
Public domain episode Equal Partners is available on the Internet Archive

1952 American television series debuts
1953 American television series endings
1950s American anthology television series
Black-and-white American television shows
NBC original programming